Helena Olsson Smeby (born 15 November 1983) is a Norwegian ski jumper. She was born in Torsby, Sweden, and lives in Trondheim, Norway, where she represents the club Byåsen IL. She competed at the FIS Nordic World Ski Championships 2009 in Liberec, where she placed sixteenth in the women's individual normal hill She competes at the 2014 Winter Olympics in Sochi, in the ladies normal hill.

References

External links

1983 births
Living people
People from Torsby Municipality
Ski jumpers at the 2014 Winter Olympics
Norwegian female ski jumpers
Olympic ski jumpers of Norway
Swedish emigrants to Norway
Naturalised citizens of Norway